Anthony Daniels (born 1946) is an English actor.

Anthony or Tony Daniels may also refer to:

Anthony Daniels (born 1949), with pen name Theodore Dalrymple, British psychiatrist and writer
Anthony Daniels (politician) (born 1982), member of the Alabama House of Representatives
Theodore Dalrymple, English physician, author, and psychiatrist
Tony Daniels (born 1963), Canadian voice actor
Tony Daniels (baseball) (Frederick Clinton Daniels) (1923–2005), American baseball player
Robert Anthony Daniels (born 1957), Canadian Roman Catholic Bishop

See also
Daniel Anthony (disambiguation)